Isa Hoes (born 13 June 1967) is a Dutch actress. She is best known for her role as Myriam van der Pol in the ongoing Dutch soap opera Goede Tijden, Slechte Tijden.

Biography
Isa Hoes was born on 13 June 1967 in Leiden in the Netherlands. She is also the younger sister of Onno Hoes, who was the mayor of Maastricht as of  1 November 2010 till 30 June 2015. Hoes graduated from the Toneelacademie Maastricht (Academy of Dramatic Arts).

She frequently dubs characters in anime, cartoons, and movies. Recently, she has become the voice of Heather from Total Drama in the Dutch version of the series.

Personal life
Isa Hoes was married to the actor Antonie Kamerling. Hoes and Kamerling met on set of the soap opera Goede Tijden, Slechte Tijden. The couple later got married on 26 June 1997 in Venice, Italy. The couple had two children named Merlijn and Vlinder. On 6 October 2010, Kamerling ended his life.

Filmography

Films
 Rebecca in Darkling
 Roos in All Stars
 Mother in Five Fingers
 Jeanine in M.A.N.
 Tanja in Alibi
 Wendy Parker in Bonding

Television
 Myriam van der Pol in Goede Tijden, Slechte Tijden (1990–1993,1994)
 Liesbeth Vrijman in Vrouwenvleugel
 Catharina Donkersloot in Rozengeur & Wodka Lime
 Isabel Zwagers in Medisch Centrum West
 Beatrix Hoogendoorn in Seth & Fiona
 Agent Ineke Slats in Coverstory
 Lydia in Windkracht 10
 Paulien in 12 steden, 13 ongelukken
 Suzanne Kramer Celblok H (Dutch remake of Wentworth)

Voice-dubbing roles

Animation
 Erika Kawaye, Katrina Villard, Jennifer Rial, Paige DeLisle, Elizabeth Strong, Tara Hendrikse, Marÿke Li and Kirsten Daily in FairlyOdd Xiaolin Crystal
 Heather in Total Drama
 Jez in Jimmy Two-Shoes
 Wendy Darling in Return to Never Land
 Cedric Errol in Little Lord Fauntleroy
 Erika (Gym Leader)/Katrina (EP069)/Jeanette Fisher in Pokémon
 Princess Atta in A Bug's Life
 Erika Kawaye, Katrina Villard, Jennifer Rial, Paige DeLisle, Elizabeth Strong, Tara Hendrikse, Marÿke Li and Kirsten Daily in Demashita! FairlyOdd Xiaolin Z
 Elastigirl/Helen Parr The Incredibles 
 Abby Mallard in Chicken Little
 Nakoma in Pocahontas
 Snork Maiden in Moomin
 Erika Kawaye, Katrina Villard, Jennifer Rial, Paige DeLisle, Elizabeth Strong, Tara Hendrikse, Marÿke Li and Kirsten Daily in FairlyOdd Xiaolin

Live action
 Betty Lou Who in How the Grinch Stole Christmas
 Jackie Framm in Air Bud: Golden Receiver

References

External links
 
 

1967 births
Living people
Dutch soap opera actresses
Dutch screenwriters
Dutch voice actresses
Dutch women novelists
Dutch women screenwriters
Maastricht Academy of Dramatic Arts alumni
People from Leiden
20th-century Dutch actresses
20th-century Dutch novelists
20th-century Dutch women writers